Korea Power Exchange, also known as KPX, is the quasi-governmental agency under the Ministry of Trade, Industry and Energy responsible for operating the electricity market and the electric power system in South Korea. In order to ensure fair and transparent operation of the market, as well as stable and efficient operation of the grid, it was established in April 2001 by being spun off from the Korea Electric Power Corporation (KEPCO) as a part of the industry restructuring efforts.

Establishment
Article 35 of the Electric Utility Act (EUA) amended on December 23, 2000, laid out the legal basis of the organization. Following the founders' meeting on March 17, 2001, it was officially founded on April 2, 2001. The original offices were located within the KEPCO headquarters building complex in Samseong-dong, Seoul until the relocation to Naju Innovation City took place in 2014.

Timeline 
 March 2001 - Founders' Meeting
 2 April 2001 - Establishment of Korea Power Exchange
 March 2004 - New Jeju Branch Office Building Completed
 June 2007 - New Cheonan Branch Office Building Completed
 6 October 2014 - Relocation of Headquarters to Naju (Official Opening on 2 December 2014)

Operations

Objectives
 Mission: Fair Electricity Market Operation and Reliable Power System Operation
 Vision: Integrated Power Business Platform for Leading Environmentally Friendly Future

Key Functions
Article 36 of the EUA lists the following:
 Opening and operating the electricity market and small-scale electricity brokerage market
 Electricity trading
 Screening membership qualifications
 Charging, adjusting, and paying the value of electricity trading and the cost arising from the electricity trading
 Calculating the volume of electricity traded
 Establishing and amending all the related rules and regulations, including the rules on operating the electricity market established under EUA Article 43 and the rules on operating the brokerage market established under EUA Article 43-2
 Operating the electric power system
 Measuring the quality of electricity and recording and preserving the results thereof under EUA Article 18 (2)

References

External links 
 
 Official website in English
 Official blog

Electric power companies of South Korea
Energy companies established in 2001
Naju
South Korean companies established in 2001
Government-owned companies of South Korea